Gonzalo Martín de Porras (born 26 July 1984) is an Argentine footballer that currently plays for Chilean Primera División B club Deportes Temuco as striker.

External links
 
 Gonzalo de Porras – De Porras' profile in Fútbol XII at Fútbol XXI 
 Gonzalo de Porras at Football-Lineups
 

1984 births
Living people
Argentine footballers
Argentine expatriate footballers
Rosario Central footballers
Olympiakos Nicosia players
Deportes Concepción (Chile) footballers
A.C. Barnechea footballers
Coquimbo Unido footballers
Cobresal footballers
C.D. Olmedo footballers
Primera B de Chile players
Chilean Primera División players
Argentine Primera División players
Cypriot First Division players
Expatriate footballers in Chile
Expatriate footballers in Mexico
Expatriate footballers in Ecuador
Expatriate footballers in Cyprus
Association football forwards
People from Neuquén